The Ful Berg is a mountain of the Plessur Alps, located east of Chur in the canton of Graubünden. It lies at the western end of the chain separating the valleys of Prättigau and Schanfigg, just east of the Rhine.

References

External links
 Ful Berg on Hikr

Mountains of the Alps
Mountains of Switzerland
Mountains of Graubünden
Two-thousanders of Switzerland